Dionysia is a genus containing 49 species of flowering plants in the family Primulaceae. They are small, cushion-forming alpines native to mountains in central Asia. They are usually evergreen perennials with felted leaves, covered with bright yellow or pink, five-petalled flowers in spring. They are often difficult to cultivate if the correct conditions are not provided.

Species include:
Dionysia aretioides
Dionysia involucrata
Dionysia michauxii
Dionysia microphylla
Dionysia mozaffarianii
Dionysia tapetodes

Dionysia aretioides, with yellow flowers, has gained the Royal Horticultural Society's Award of Garden Merit.

References

External links

  The genus Dionysia

Primulaceae
Primulaceae genera
Taxa named by Eduard Fenzl